Kenneth Arlington Morrow (born October 17, 1956) is an American former professional ice hockey defenseman and a member of the 1980 USA Olympic Miracle on Ice hockey team. He is currently serving as the New York Islanders' director of pro scouting.  A member of the United States Hockey Hall of Fame, he played 550 regular season games in the National Hockey League between 1980 and 1989.

Amateur career
Ken Morrow was born in Flint and grew up in the nearby town of Davison, Michigan. He is a graduate of Davison High School.
Morrow attended Bowling Green State University in Bowling Green, Ohio where he was a star defenseman and also represented Team USA at the 1978 Ice Hockey World Championship. His best year as a college player was in 1979 when he was named Central Collegiate Hockey Association player of the year.

The following season, Morrow played for the 1980 U.S. Olympic hockey team that beat the Soviet team in an event known as the Miracle on Ice during the 1980 Winter Olympics before defeating Finland to win the gold medal.

Professional career
Selected 68th overall in the 1976 NHL Entry Draft by the New York Islanders, Morrow joined the Islanders immediately after the Olympics. He helped them win their first Stanley Cup in 1980, making him the first player to win the Olympic Gold and an NHL championship in one season. He was an integral member of all four Islanders Stanley Cup teams in 1980, 1981, 1982 and 1983.  Although Morrow was never a goal-scorer, during the playoffs the Isles often benefited from his clutch goal scoring at key times. Morrow also returned to the United States national team for the 1981 Canada Cup tournament.

His most indiviaul acomplishment in his professional career was during the 1984 playoff win in game seven his goal beat the New York Rangers

During the 1980 and 1983 playoffs, Morrow had arthroscopic surgeries performed to his knees, and played only days afterward in order to contribute to the Islanders championships, often having fluid drained from his knees between games. He was eventually forced to retire prematurely from the game in 1988–89 due to constant knee problems.

Post playing career
Morrow, who was inducted into the United States Hockey Hall of Fame in 1995, has been director of pro scouting for the Isles since 1993.  He previously served as the Islanders' assistant coach for one season, in 1991–92. He was also co-coach of the International Hockey League's Kansas City franchise in 1990–91 and assistant coach of the IHL Flint Spirits in 1989–90 shortly after retiring from hockey. On December 31, 2011, Morrow was inducted into the New York Islanders Hall of Fame.
Ken Morrow is also President of KCIce, an Outdoor Ice Rink Development and Management company in Kansas City, MO.

In popular culture
In the 1981 TV movie about the 1980 gold medal-winning U.S. Hockey team called Miracle on Ice, he is played by Scott Feraco.

Morrow was portrayed by actor Casey Burnette in the 2004 Walt Disney Studios film Miracle.  Before the events of the movie, Burnette played junior hockey for the Barrie Colts in the Ontario Hockey League, the Hull Olympiques (now called the Gatineau Olympiques) and the Montreal Rocket, both in the Quebec Major Junior Hockey League. Burnette is clean-shaven in the film, although the real Morrow had a beard at the time the film is set. While most of the players on the team were not allowed to wear facial hair, coach Herb Brooks specifically allowed Morrow to keep his beard, since Morrow had a beard prior to joining the team.

Awards and achievements

Career statistics

Regular season and playoffs

International

See also
 List of members of the United States Hockey Hall of Fame

References

External links

Ken Morrow's bio @ Hockeydraftcentral.com

1956 births
1980 US Olympic ice hockey team
AHCA Division I men's ice hockey All-Americans
American men's ice hockey defensemen
Bowling Green Falcons men's ice hockey players
Ice hockey coaches from Michigan
Ice hockey players at the 1980 Winter Olympics
Living people
Lester Patrick Trophy recipients
Medalists at the 1980 Winter Olympics
New England Whalers draft picks
New York Islanders coaches
New York Islanders draft picks
New York Islanders players
New York Islanders scouts
Olympic gold medalists for the United States in ice hockey
People from Davison, Michigan
Sportspeople from Flint, Michigan
Stanley Cup champions
United States Hockey Hall of Fame inductees
Ice hockey players from Michigan